aka Kidoshin キドシン (1916-1975) was a Japanese dancer.

Filmography 
He played in 36 films:
 (あきれた娘たち Akireta musume-tachi), alternate title: (金語楼の子宝騒動) (1949)
 (おどろき一家 Odoroki ikka) (1949)
 (憧れのハワイ航路 Akogare no Hawaii kōro) (1950)

References

External links 
 

Japanese male film actors
1916 births
1975 deaths
20th-century Japanese male actors